Qube Holdings is a diversified logistics and infrastructure company in Australia.

History
In July 2006, following the takeover of Patrick Corporation by Toll Holdings, Chris Corrigan and some executives departed and teamed with Kaplan Funds Management to explore logistics opportunities. In January 2007, the KFM Diversified Infrastructure & Logistics Fund was listed on the Australian Securities Exchange.

In April 2007, a 75% shareholding in P&O Automotive & General Stevedoring and 50% shareholding in P&O Trans Australia were acquired from DP World.

In June 2010, the KFM Diversified Infrastructure & Logistics Fund was renamed Qube Logistics. In April 2011, Qube exercised an option to take its ownership in P&O Trans Australia up to 95%. In 2012, Qube purchased Independent Rail of Australia.

In January 2015 Qube acquired ISO limited in New Zealand.

As part of the break up of Asciano, Qube purchased a 50% stake in Patrick Corporation in August 2016.

In 2019, Qube acquired Chalmers Industries and LCR Group. In September 2021, Newcastle Agri Terminal was acquired.

Operations

Ports and bulk
Qube has freight handling and stevedoring facilities at 29 ports in Australia through its subsidiaries P&O Automotive and General Stevedoring, Northern Stevedoring Services, Australian Amalgamated Terminals, PrixCar and the W Qube joint venture between Qube and Wilhelmsen Ships Service. It is also a 50% joint venture partner in Patrick Corporation.

Logistics
Qube Logistics operates road and rail services. Qube operates rail freight services in regional New South Wales and Victoria, and between Melbourne and Adelaide. In January 2022, Qube commenced operating a contract to transport BlueScope products from its steel works at Port Kembla to Melbourne and Brisbane. It owns the Moorebank Intermodal Terminal in Sydney.

Locomotive fleet
As at October 2019, Qube owned the following locomotives:

Strategic Assets
The Strategic Assets business is responsible for the development of expansion projects and investments. These include:
 Moorebank Intermodal Terminal
 Minto Intermodal Terminal (acquired June 2012 and included the assets of Independent Rail of Australia.
 Quattro Grain Terminal (Port Kembla)
 TQ Bulk Liquids Terminal (Port Kembla)
 AAT Facilities Management
 Newcastle Agri Terminal, acquired September 2021

References

External links
Official site

 
Interstate rail in Australia
Logistics companies of Australia
Freight railway companies of Australia
Australian companies established in 2006
Railway companies established in 2006
Companies based in Sydney
Holding companies of Australia
Companies listed on the Australian Securities Exchange